Fagerholm's first cabinet was the 32nd government of Finland, which lasted from 29 August 1948 to 17 March 1950. It was a minority government headed by Social Democratic Prime Minister Karl-August Fagerholm.
 
Fagerholm’s first cabinet was the first government of which the Finnish People's Democratic League wasn't a part. During the cabinet’s reign, foreign relations to the West, particularly to the United States, improved. During the cabinet’s existence, Finland's State Police was defunct and its successor, the Finnish Security Intelligence Service Supo, was founded.

Ministers

References 

Fagerholm, 1
1948 establishments in Finland
1950 disestablishments in Finland
Cabinets established in 1948
Cabinets disestablished in 1950